Grete Kubitschek (born 1903, date of death unknown) was an Austrian figure skater. She competed in the women's singles event at the 1928 Winter Olympics.

References

1903 births
Place of birth missing
Date of death missing
Place of death missing
Olympic figure skaters of Austria
Figure skaters at the 1928 Winter Olympics
Austrian female single skaters